McRae-McQueen House is a historic home located near Johns, Scotland County, North Carolina. The original section was built about 1810, and is a rectangular one-story  frame structure.  It was enlarged with a two-story, Federal style block in the 1870s.  The later block has bracketed eaves and a two-tier portico.

It was added to the National Register of Historic Places in 1980.

References

External links

Houses on the National Register of Historic Places in North Carolina
Federal architecture in North Carolina
Italianate architecture in North Carolina
Houses completed in 1810
Houses in Scotland County, North Carolina
National Register of Historic Places in Scotland County, North Carolina